is a video, experimental film and performance artist based in Kyoto, Japan and the leader of the Kyupi Kyupi artist collective, founded in 1996. He has directed work for both art museums, including Kyupi Kyupi performances at the Palais de Tokyo and Tate Modern in 2003, and commercial television and film, his most famous creation being the Fuccons, a family of mannequins who first appeared in Vermilion Pleasure Night in 2000 and since in their own program Oh! Mikey and its spin-offs.

Filmography

References

External links
 
 

20th-century Japanese artists
21st-century Japanese artists
Japanese experimental filmmakers
Japanese cinematographers
Japanese contemporary artists
Japanese film directors
Japanese film editors
Japanese film producers
Japanese performance artists
Japanese screenwriters
Japanese television directors
Japanese television producers
Japanese television writers
People from Kyoto Prefecture
Television editors
Japanese video artists
1968 births
Living people